José de Jesús González Hernández (born 25 December 1964) is a Mexican Roman Catholic bishop.

González Hernández was born in Mexico and was ordained to the priesthood in 1994. He served as bishop of the Territorial Prelature of Jesús María del Nayar from 2010 to 2022. In 2022, he was appointed bishop of the Diocese of Chilpancingo-Chilapa.

Notes

External links

21st-century Roman Catholic bishops in Mexico
1964 births
Living people